WTGR (97.5 FM) is a radio station  broadcasting a country music format. Licensed to Union City, Ohio, United States; the station is currently owned by Positive Radio Group of Ohio and features programming from CNN Radio.

History
The station went on the air as WFOW on November 13, 1989, later changing its call letters to WBNN on March 30, 1990, and to the current WTGR on April 23, 1991.

WTGR's transmitter is located in Union City just east of the Ohio-Indiana state line with its studios and offices located in a building which formerly housed a carpet business on Martin Street (State Route 571 East) in Greenville. Since the signal upgrade and retargeting of the former WDRK toward Dayton under later call letters WLSN, WBKI, WDJO-FM, WOLT, and, now, WTKD), WTGR remains as Darke County's only locally-originating, commercial radio station.

From 1993 to 1996, WTGR had an AM sister station, broadcasting daytime-only at 1030 kHz. With call letters WBOL, this sister station aired a combination of country music and farm news and information from Ed Johnson's ABN. In 1996, it was decided to return that AM license back to the FCC.

Call sign history
The "WTGR" call letters and "Tiger Radio" nickname had been used originally at Top-Forty-formatted AM stations in Charleston and Point Pleasant, West Virginia, in the 1960s and, in the 1970s, at an AM station in Myrtle Beach, South Carolina. The current WTGR formerly employed a classic rock format  as "97.5 The Tiger" before its switch to country, and the WBOL callsign is now used at an AM station in Bolivar, Tennessee.

WTGR was also the callsign for the University of Memphis Tigers' campus radio station (TGR for Tiger Radio) in the late 1960s and early 1970s as a low-power AM educational radio station with an effective radiated power of only 10 watts.

References

External links

TGR
Darke County, Ohio
Randolph County, Indiana
1989 establishments in Indiana
Radio stations established in 1989